An upside-down cake is a cake that is baked "upside-down" in a single pan, usually a skillet, with its toppings at the bottom of the pan. When removed from the oven, the finished upside-down preparation is flipped over and de-panned onto a serving plate, thus "righting" it, and serving it right-side up.

Usually chopped or sliced fruits — such as apples, cherries, peaches, or pineapples — butter, and sugar are placed on the bottom of the pan before the batter is poured in, so that they form a baked-on topping after the cake is inverted. A simple cottage pudding cake batter may be used.

The first American recipes for upside-down cake, using prunes, appeared in newspapers in 1923.

Traditional upside-down preparations include the American pineapple upside-down cake, the French Tarte Tatin, and the Brazilian or Portuguese bolo de ananás (also known as bolo de abacaxi). In the United States, pineapple upside down cakes became popular in the mid-1920s after Dole Pineapple Company sponsored a contest for pineapple recipes. They received over 2,500 various submissions for the inverted pineapple cake and ran an advertisement about it, which increased the cake's popularity.

Gallery

See also
 Pineapple cake

References

External links

 

Cakes
Pineapple dishes